Padstow railway station is located on the East Hills line, serving the Sydney suburb of Padstow. It is served by Sydney Trains T8 Airport & South line services.

History
Padstow station opened on 21 December 1931 when the line was extended from Kingsgrove to East Hills.

On 5 May 1986, the line was duplicated from Riverwood with a new track laid to the north of the existing one. The line from Padstow to Revesby was duplicated around the same time.

In 2002, the station was upgraded and given a new concourse and lift.

In 2013, as part of the quadruplication of the line from Kingsgrove to Revesby, through lines were added on either side of the existing pair.

Platforms and services

References

External links

Padstow Station details Transport for New South Wales

City of Canterbury-Bankstown
Easy Access railway stations in Sydney
Railway stations in Sydney
Railway stations in Australia opened in 1931
East Hills railway line